1971–72 Albanian Cup was the twentieth season of Albania's annual cup competition. It began in August 1971 with the First Round and ended in May 1972 with the Final matches. Dinamo Tirana were the defending champions, having won their seventh Albanian Cup last season. The cup was won by Vllaznia.

The rounds were played in a two-legged format similar to those of European competitions. If the aggregated score was tied after both games, the team with the higher number of away goals advanced. If the number of away goals was equal in both games, the match was decided by extra time and a penalty shootout, if necessary.

First round
Games were played on August, 1971*

 Results unknown

Second round
In this round entered the 16 winners from the previous round. First and second legs were played in January 1972.

|}

Quarter-finals
In this round entered the 8 winners from the previous round.

|}

Semi-finals
In this round entered the four winners from the previous round.

|}

Finals
In this round entered the two winners from the previous round.

|}

First leg

Second leg

References

 Calcio Mondiale Web

External links
 Official website 

Albanian Cup seasons
Cup
Albania